Joseph Fourier University (UJF, also known as Grenoble I) was a French university situated in the city of Grenoble and focused on the fields of sciences, technologies and health. It is now part of the Université Grenoble Alpes.

Importance
According to the 2009 ARWU, Joseph Fourier University is the sixth best university in France. Joseph Fourier University is also the fourth best university in Engineering & IT nationally and 115th globally in QS World University Rankings. The origins of this scientific university can be traced all the way back to 1811 when the scientist Joseph Fourier established a faculty of science in Grenoble.

Nowadays, more than 18,000 undergraduate and graduate students participate to the life of this university. More than 2,000 are international or exchange students. Joseph Fourier University is not only famous for its alumni, but also for its commitment to fundamental as well as applied research and innovation.

Part of the university is the Observatoire des Sciences de l'Univers de Grenoble (OSUG), a leading institution in the field of earth, space and environmental sciences.

Facilities
The main facilities are located on a vast campus east of Grenoble, on the commune of Saint-Martin d'Hères (and partially on that of Gières). This campus is shared with other higher education organizations, see University of Grenoble. The university also has teaching and research installations in the city of Grenoble proper.

The university runs many laboratories, many in association with CNRS, Grenoble-INP and other major institutions.

UJF also maintains the Jardin botanique alpin du Lautaret alpine garden on the Lautaret pass, in association with CNRS.

Education and teaching
Many master's degrees are taught in English, for example :
 Master in Chemistry
 Master in Nanoscience and Nanotechnology
 Master in International Development Studies
 Master in Environmental Fluid Mechanics
 Master in Systems, Control and Information Technology (MISCIT)
 Master of Science in informatics at Grenoble (MOSIG)
 Master of Science in Industrial and Applied Mathematics (MSIAM)
 Master in Biology
 Master Geomechanics, Civil Engineering and Risks

A Bachelor Summer Program taught in English with scientific courses as well as French courses is offered from June to mid-July.

Alumni 
Alim-Louis Benabid, Breakthrough prize, Life Science (2015)
Yves Bréchet, Material Science
Rajaâ Cherkaoui El Moursli, physicist, member of the "Académie Hassan II des Sciences et Techniques"
Hélène Courtois, astrophysicist
Charles Elachi, director of the Jet Propulsion Lab (NASA)
Park Geun-hye, former president of South Korea
Ariane Mézard, mathematician
Vera Lúcia de Miranda Guarda, human rights activist and Brazilian UNESCO chairperson
Sakura Pascarelli, physicist
Rammal Rammal, a Lebanese condensed matter physicist.

References

External links 
fr:  Joseph Fourier University (Université Joseph Fourier)
fr: Centre Universitaire Drôme-Ardèche
fr: École de Physique des Houches

Universities and colleges in Grenoble
Engineering universities and colleges in France
Technical universities and colleges in France
Educational institutions established in 1970
Educational institutions disestablished in 2015
1970 establishments in France
2015 disestablishments in France
Grenoble Alpes University
Defunct universities and colleges in France